Weiser Hall is located in the central campus of the University of Michigan in Ann Arbor, Michigan. 

It was originally built in 1963 by Albert Kahn Associates, as the David M. Dennison Building. Originally named for David M. Dennison, it was renamed Weiser Hall in 2014 in recognition of U-M alumni and donors Ronald Weiser and Eileen Weiser. The building underwent a complete renovation reopening in September 2017. 

The renovation, undertaken by architectural firm Diamond Schmitt Architects, involved completely gutting and rebuilding the entire tower. The brick on the tenth floor south side, and the entire southwest corner of every floor was removed and replaced with glass. This resulted in the development of a tenth-floor event space with catering kitchen and views of Ann Arbor through the floor to ceiling south facing wall of glass. It now houses four two-story common rooms and kitchens on every second floor.   

The building is now home to a number of interdisciplinary and internationally-focused units within the College of Literature, Science, and the Arts, and is a center for active and engaged learning.

Tenants in the Weiser Hall hi-rise include the Center for Global and Intercultural Study (CGIS), Community-Engaged Academic Learning (CEAL) and International Institute. The International Institute is the largest of the tenants with three floors of offices housing several regional and academic sub-units.

The low-rise section contains a number of large lecture halls; and a Physics Demonstration Lab in the lower level.  The two sections are connected by a breezeway on the second floor.

References

External links 
 
 

Skyscrapers in Ann Arbor, Michigan
Dennison Building
University and college academic buildings in the United States
1963 establishments in Michigan